Roy Lacaud Heenan,  (September 28, 1935 – February 3, 2017) was a Canadian labour lawyer, academic and art collector. He was a founding partner of the Canadian law firm Heenan Blaikie.

Early life and education 
He was born in Mexico City to Ernest Heenan and his wife Yvonne Lacaud, and moved to Canada in 1947. He attended Trinity College School in Port Hope, Ontario, graduating in 1953. Heenan subsequently received a Bachelor of Arts degree in 1957 and a Bachelor of Civil Law degree in 1960, both from McGill University, where he joined the Kappa Alpha Society.

Career 
Heenan was called to the Bar of Quebec in 1961. He was a co-founder of Heenan Blaikie in 1973 and Chair of the Executive Committee until 2012. The firm closed in 2014 after its partners voted to dissolve it.

He was an Adjunct Professor in labour law at McGill University from 1971 to 1996, and a lecturer for the Industrial Relations Centre at Queen's University since 1972. He had also taught at Université Laval and the University of Ottawa.

Heenan served as the first chairman of the Pierre Elliott Trudeau Foundation. He was also a member of the board of the Canadian Broadcasting Corporation.

Honours 
In 1998, Heenan was made an Officer of the Order of Canada in recognition of being "one of the country's leading labour lawyers who has also made significant contributions to academic life and the art world". McGill University awarded him an honorary Doctor of Laws (LL.D.) degree in 2008.

Death 
Heenan died after a long illness on February 3, 2017, aged 81.

References

External links
 Roy Heenan – official website

1935 births
2017 deaths
Lawyers in Quebec
People from Mexico City
Canadian legal scholars
Academic staff of McGill University
Trinity College School alumni
Academic staff of Université Laval
Bishop's College School alumni
Officers of the Order of Canada
Academic staff of Queen's University at Kingston
Academic staff of the University of Ottawa
Labour law scholars
Labour lawyers
McGill University Faculty of Law alumni